The Miss República Dominicana 2004 was held on April 3, 2004. That year 34 candidates competed for the national crown. The chosen winner will represent the Dominican Republic at the Miss Universe 2004 pageant which was held in Santo Dominigo, Republica Dominicana. 16 Provinces, 16 Municipalities and 2 Dominican Communities had entered.

Results

| Miss Photogenic*Santiago - Julissa Ramos

Delegates

External links
 http://dr1.com/news/2004/dnews040504.shtml

Miss Dominican Republic
2004 beauty pageants
2004 in the Dominican Republic